is an eroge series created by Alice Soft, and a hentai anime OVA animated by Pink Pineapple in 2002.

Plot
Sayuka Kōenji is the guardian of the Earth and has the ability to transform into her alter ego Escalayer to protect the world from the evil forces of the Dielast. However, in order to transform into Escalayer she must recharge her power source, the Doki Doki Dynamo which can only be recharged through sexual excitement.  This was previously achieved through lesbian sex with her gynoid friend Madoka, however, this has become less effective and Madoka recruits the school playboy Kyōhei Yanase whose vast sexual experience will help Sayuka transform.

Characters

The main protagonist.  She commands the ability to transform into a super powered being known as "Escalayer" upon "charging" the Doki Doki Dynamo through sexual activity.  As the story develops she is seen to grow feelings toward Kyōhei, eventually professing her love to him. Her main weapon is a shape-shifting energy whip.

The school playboy and Sayuka's childhood friend.  Kyōhei is blackmailed into helping Sayuka after he is discovered eavesdropping on an unsuccessful charging session.  While at first their relationship was strictly used for the aim of charging the Dynamo, Kyōhei rediscovers the feelings he once held for her.  Acknowledging these feelings, he proceeds to profess them to her.

Sayuka's gynoid companion.  Self-sacrificing and no-nonsense, she often has to ground Sayuka and Kyōhei back in reality with the importance of their mission.  She initially considers Kyōhei a simple tool, insulting his inability to stimulate Sayuka as time progresses.  She later develops a deeper relationship with him towards the end, however.  Her main weapon is a gun attached to her right arm.

Releases
The anime series was released on DVD in North America through Kitty Media both subtitled and dubbed, and by Siren Visual in Australia and New Zealand under its Hentai Collection label. The original game has not been officially released outside Japan.

A series of 3 novels were published by Paradigm Novels:
Beat Angel Escalayer joukan (超昂天使エスカレイヤー 上巻)
Beat Angel Escalayer chuukan (超昂天使エスカレイヤー 中巻)
Beat Angel Escalayer gekan (超昂天使エスカレイヤー 下巻)

A remake of the game titled  was released on 25 July 2014. Worldwide English version of the game was released by MangaGamer Jun 11, 2020 under the title "Beat Angel Escalayer R". It was based on the "Reboot" version of the original game.

Reception

Chris Beveridge recommended Beat Angel Escalayer as a "really fun and enjoyable quality adult series".

References

Further reading

External links
 Official page for Beat Angel Escalayer R
 
 
 

2002 anime OVAs
Eroge
Hentai anime and manga
Kitty Media
Pink Pineapple
Video games developed in Japan
Windows games
Windows-only games